"Tail" (stylized in all caps) is a song by South Korean singer and songwriter Sunmi. It was released as a standalone single on February 23, 2021 through Abyss Company. "Tail" was made available for digital download and streaming, and includes the B-side track "What the Flower". Both recordings were written by Sunmi, with additional production credits handled by Frants on "Tail" and Hong Song-jin on the B-side.

Musically, "Tail" is a dance and city pop song which conveys her instinctive feelings regarding love, similar to how "animals use their tail to express their emotions". Commercially, "Tail" peaked at number 22 on the Gaon Digital Chart.

Background and release 
On February 2, 2021, Sunmi's agency Makeus Entertainment (now named Abyss Company), stated that Sunmi is preparing to comeback at the end of February with a new release. On February 10, the singer announced the date of the release via Instagram. On February 15, the tracklist of the single was released. Concept photos and videos for both songs were released on February 17 and 18, as well as a track spoiler video the following day. The music video teaser for "Tail" was released on February 22, 2021. The single released digitally on February 23 along with the music video for the title track.

Music and lyrics
Turning 30 this year in Korean age, the new single marked a milestone for Sunmi. "It’s my first move taken in my 30s and I feel like I’ve taken a very daring step forward," she said. The disco lead single, "Tail" is a dance and city pop song about a "super sensitive cat woman villainess who wants love with all her heart, expressing her deepest instinctive feelings". Sunmi added: "Animals use their tail to express their emotions". The song features a unique sense of rhythm and a catchy melody. "What the Flower" is a soul-infused B-side track with her lush vocals moving nimbly across sparkling guitar work and warm piano.

Critical reception 

Sofiana Ramli of NME wrote that "the pair of songs work well together, presenting new facades to a beloved veteran performer". Writing for IZM, Stern stated that "Tail" is a "song that reveals Sunmi's concerns, who don't want to fall into mannerism".

The A-side song "Tail" won best song in the official 2021 Miyane fan club awards. In addition, the B Side "What the Flower" won the best B-side award for the same year.

Track listing

Credits
Credits adapted from Melon.
 Lee Sun-mivocals, lyrics, composition, arrangement
 Frantscomposition, arrangement (1)
 Hong So-jincomposition, arrangement (2)

Charts

Release history

References 

Sunmi songs
2021 singles
Korean-language songs